Bhagwal is a village located near Chakwal in the Punjab Province of Pakistan. It is located at 33°4'32N 72°35'45E. The surrounding villages are Khara, Sohair, Gah, Ranjha, Patalian, Roopwal, Chawali Marath and Karsal. Bhagwal is also the hometown and ancestral village of the prominent Journalist-politician Ayaz Amir.

References

Populated places in Chakwal District